Lac Wey is one of four departments in Logone Occidental, a region of Chad. Its capital is Moundou. It was created by decree N° 415/PR/MAT/02 and 419/PR/MAT/02.

References

Departments of Chad
Logone Occidental Region